= Moro railway station =

Railway station in Pakistan

Moro railway station مورو ريلوي اسٽيشن

General information
- Owner: Ministry of Railways

Other information
- Station code: MRS

History
- Former names: Great Indian Peninsula Railway

Moro railway station (Urdu: مورو ریلوے اسٹیشن, Sindhi: مورو ريلوي اسٽيشن) is located in Moro, Sindh, Pakistan.

== See also ==
- List of railway stations in Pakistan
- Pakistan Railways
